Loyalties is a 1922 play by the British writer John Galsworthy. It was staged at St Martins Theatre and ran for over a year. Galsworthy described it as "the only play of mine which I was able to say, when I finished it, no manager will refuse this". The original West End cast included Ernest Milton, Edmund Breon, Eric Maturin, Malcolm Keen, Ian Hunter, Cathleen Nesbitt, Beatrix Thomson and Meggie Albanesi.

Adaptations
In 1933 it was made into a film Loyalties directed by Basil Dean and starring Basil Rathbone.

In 1976, BBC Television broadcast a version as part of their Play of the Month series. This production starred Edward Fox, Polly Adams.  It was directed by Rudolph Cartier and produced by Cedric Messina.

References

Bibliography
 Cody, Gabrielle H. & Sprinchorn, Evert. The Columbia Encyclopedia of Modern Drama; vol. 1. New York: Columbia University Press, 2007.
 Wearing, J. P. The London Stage 1920–1929: A Calendar of Productions, Performers, and Personnel. Rowman & Littlefield, 2014.

External links
 

Plays by John Galsworthy
1922 plays
British plays adapted into films
Plays about race and ethnicity
West End plays